Phractura scaphyrhynchura is a species of catfish in the genus Phractura. It lives in the Ogooué and Congo river systems. It has a length of 15 cm.

References 

scaphyrhynchura
Freshwater fish of Africa
Fish described in 1886
Taxa named by Léon Vaillant